4-Bromothiophenol is an organic compound with the formula BrC6H4SH. It forms colorless crystals.

Synthesis
4-Bromothiophenol can be synthesized via the reduction of 4-bromo-benzenesulfonyl chloride by red phosphorus and iodine in an acidic solution. Hydrogenation of 4,4'-dibromodiphenyl disulfide also produces 4-bromothiophenol.

Reactions
It reacts with acetylacetone in the presence of cesium carbonate to give 3-(4-bromophenylthio)pentane-2,4-dione. 4,4'-Dibromophenyl disulfide is also produced as the intermediate.

Like other thiols, it reacts with silver nitrate to produce silver 4-bromothiophenolate.

References

Bromoarenes
Thiols